Óscar Figueroa  may refer to:

 Óscar Figueroa (film editor) (born 1958), Mexican film editor
 Óscar Figueroa (weightlifter) (born 1983), Colombian weightlifter